Hylorchilus is a genus of bird in the family Troglodytidae. 
It contains the following species:
 Nava's wren (Hylorchilus navai)
 Sumichrast's wren (Hylorchilus sumichrasti)

References

 
Troglodytidae
 
 
Taxonomy articles created by Polbot